Aichi 6th district (愛知県第6区 Aichi-ken dai-roku or simply 愛知6区 Aichi rokku) is a constituency of the House of Representatives in the Diet of Japan (national legislature). It is located in Northwestern Aichi and consists of the cities of Kasugai, Inuyama and Komaki, part of the Chūkyō Metropolitan Area around Nagoya. As of 2012, 420,807 eligible voters were registered in the district.

Before the electoral reform of 1994, the area formed part of Aichi 2nd district where four Representatives had been elected by single non-transferable vote.

The seat representing Aichi 6th had fallen vacant in early 2011 when representative Yoshihiro Ishida (DPJ) resigned for his unsuccessful campaign in the 2011 mayoral election in Nagoya, part of the "triple vote" (triple tōhyō) in Nagoya and Aichi on February 6, 2011 when elections for governor of Aichi, mayor of Nagoya and a recall referendum for the Nagoya city council took place. The by-election to replace Ishida took place on April 24, 2011, the day of the second round of the 2011 unified regional elections when mayors and councils in hundreds of cities, special wards, towns and villages across Japan are elected. The campaign officially took off on April 12, 2011: The Democratic Party did not nominate a candidate, Nagoya mayor Takashi Kawamura's party Genzei Nippon ("Tax cuts Japan") that won 13 seats in the Aichi assembly election on April 10 nominated journalist Masayo Kawamura; former representative Hideki Niwa ran for the LDP and won the by-election. In the general House of Representatives election of 2012, Niwa easily defended the seat against former prefectural assemblyman Masaki Amano and former Democrat Tomohiko Mizuno who had represented the Minami-Kantō PR block since 2009.

List of representatives

Election results

References 

Aichi Prefecture
Districts of the House of Representatives (Japan)